Umaslan-e Sofla (also Romanized as Ūmāslān-e Soflá; also known as Ūmāstān) is a village in Ojarud-e Sharqi Rural District, Muran District, Germi County, Ardabil Province, Iran. At the 2006 census, its population was 92, in 19 families.

References 

Towns and villages in Germi County